Lignières may refer to the following places:

Belgium
Lignières, a hamlet in Marche-en-Famenne, Wallonia

France
Lignières, Aube
Lignières, Cher
Lignières, Indre et Loire
Lignières, Loir-et-Cher
Lignières, Somme

Switzerland
Lignières, Neuchâtel